A bronze statue of Jerry West by Omri Amrany and Julie Rotblatt Amrany is installed outside Los Angeles' Crypto.com Arena, in the U.S. state of California. The sculpture was unveiled in 2011.

References 

Bronze sculptures in California
Monuments and memorials in Los Angeles
Outdoor sculptures in Greater Los Angeles
Sculptures of men in California
South Park (Downtown Los Angeles)
Statues in Los Angeles
Statues of sportspeople